Toowoomba (nicknamed 'The Garden City' and 'T-Bar') is a city in the Toowoomba Region of the Darling Downs, Queensland, Australia. Toowoomba is the second-most-populous inland city in the country after the national capital of Canberra and hence the largest city on the Darling Downs, and it is the third largest regional centre in Queensland. It is also referred to as the capital of the Darling Downs.

The Toowoomba region is the home of two main Aboriginal language groups, the Giabal whose lands extend south of the city and Jarowair whose lands extend north of the city. The Jarowair lands include the site of one of Australia's most important sacred Bora ceremonial ground, the ‘Gummingurru stone arrangement’ dated to c.4000 BC. The site marked one of the major routes employed by many Aboriginal tribes to the south and southeast to participate in the triennial bunya nut feast. The feast was Australia's largest Indigenous event, and of cultural and spiritual significance. 
The first European knowledge of the area was recorded when English botanist Allan Cunningham explored the region in 1827 and named it after Ralph Darling, then Governor of New South Wales. British drays began arriving from 1840, enticed by the rich pastoral lands, and established the settlement of Drayton in 1842. Violent conflict erupted as Indigenous tribes attempted to force drays from encroaching on the Darling Downs, with the Battle of One Tree Hill being fought near Toowoomba. 

William Horton founded the Royal Bull's Head Inn in 1847, and in 1852 he invested in a new hotel in the area known as ‘The Swamp’. A rivalry between this newfound settlement (later renamed to Toowoomba) and the previously established town of Drayton eventually ended when Toowoomba outgrew and absorbed Drayton as time went on. The town elected its first mayor in 1861, former convict William Henry Groom, and by 1867 it was connected by rail to Ipswich, which was also the first over the Great Dividing Range. In 1904 Toowoomba was declared a city, and saw the Austral Society founded there by the esteemed national poet George Essex Evans. Over the 20th century, Toowoomba expanded from a primarily agriculture-based economy to provide services with increasing demand such as advanced education and medical facilities.

A university and cathedral city, Toowoomba is largely preserved of its Victorian era architecture and gardens of which there are more than 150 public parks including the historic Queens Park.  The city hosts the Toowoomba Carnival of Flowers each September and national championship events for the sports of mountain biking and motocross. Toowoomba is served by Toowoomba Wellcamp Airport and the smaller Toowoomba City Aerodrome. In recent years Toowoomba has seen high rise developments built to accommodate high population growth in the region.

Geography

A few streets are on the eastern side of the edge of the range, but most of the city is west of the divide.

The city occupies the edge of the range and the low ridges behind it. Two valleys run north from the southern boundary, each arising from springs either side of Middle Ridge near Spring Street at an altitude of around 680 m. These waterways, East Creek and West Creek, flow together just north of the CBD to form Gowrie Creek.

Gowrie Creek drains to the west across the Darling Downs and is a tributary of the Condamine River, part of the Murray–Darling basin.

The rich volcanic soil in the region helps maintain the 150 public parks that are scattered across the city. Jacaranda, camphor laurel and plane trees line many of the city streets. The city's reputation as 'The Garden City' is highlighted during the Australian Carnival of Flowers festival held in September each year. Deciduous trees from around the world line many of the parks, giving a display of autumn colour.

Suburbs
The City of Toowoomba includes the following suburbs:

 Centenary Heights
 Cotswold Hills2
 Cranley
 Darling Heights
 Drayton

 East Toowoomba
 Glenvale2
 Harlaxton
 Harristown

 Kearneys Spring
 Middle Ridge
 Mount Kynoch
 Mount Lofty
 Newtown

 North Toowoomba
 Prince Henry Heights
 Rangeville
 Redwood
 Rockville

 South Toowoomba
 Toowoomba City (the city centre)
 Torrington2
 Wilsonton
 Wilsonton Heights

2 - from former Shire of Jondaryan

History

Traditional owners 
Giabal and Jarowair are recognised as the two main Aboriginal language groups of the Toowoomba  with Giabal extending south of the city while Jarowair extends north of the city. The Jarowair (also known as Yarowair, Yarow-wair, Barrunggam, Yarrowair, Yarowwair and Yarrow-weir) language region includes the landscape within the local government boundaries of the Toowoomba Regional Council, particularly Toowoomba north to Crows Nest and west to Oakey.

This traditional landscape changed dramatically with the settlement of Drayton in the 1840s and the pastoral expansion west. Those Aboriginal Australians that survived the frontier conflict of this time were pushed to the fringe of society in camps and later moved to missions such as Deebing Creek, Durundur and later Barambah (now Cherbourg). There is evidence that local Aboriginal Australians were working on the properties to the west of Toowoomba in this contact period. Ceremonies such as the Bonye Bonye festival remained active until the late 19th century – groups from south east and south west Queensland as well as northern New South Wales gathered at Gummingurru, near Gowrie (west of Toowoomba) prior to attending the festival. The Gummingurru site is being restored and remains an important ceremonial place for not only the traditional groups but neighbouring groups.

European exploration and settlement 

Land for the town was first surveyed in 1849, then again in 1853.

Towards the end of the 1840s Drayton had grown to the point where it had its own newspaper, general store, trading post and the Royal Bull's Head Inn, which was built by William Horton and still stands today. Horton is regarded as the true founder of Toowoomba despite not being the first European person to live there. Drovers and wagon masters spread the news of the new settlement at Toowoomba. By 1858 Toowoomba was growing fast. It had a population of 700, three hotels and many stores. Governor Bowen granted the wish of locals and a new municipality was proclaimed on 24 November 1860.

The first town council election took place on 4 January 1861 and William Henry Groom won. The railway from Ipswich was opened in 1867, bringing with it business development. In 1892, the Under Secretary of Public Land proclaimed Toowoomba and the surrounding areas as a township and in 1904 Toowoomba was declared a city. Pastoralism replaced agriculture and dairying by the 1900s.

In July 1902, 80 subdivided allotments of "The Lilley Estate" owned by the late Sir Charles Lilley, were advertised to be auctioned by Scholefield & Godsall. A map advertising the auction shows that the estate was bordered by Bridge, Mary and Lindsay Streets and overlooking and adjoining the Royal Agricultural Society's Showgrounds.

The Rotary Club of Toowoomba was established in 1930.

During World War II, Toowoomba was the location of RAAF No.7 Inland Aircraft Fuel Depot (IAFD), completed in 1942 and closed on 29 August 1944. Usually consisting of 4 tanks, 31 fuel depots were built across Australia for the storage and supply of aircraft fuel for the RAAF and the US Army Air Forces at a total cost of £900,000 ($1,800,000).

Toowoomba was named as Australia's Tidiest Town in 2008.

On 10 January 2011, Toowoomba suffered a catastrophic flash flood. Unusually heavy rainfall had occurred in the preceding days, causing the city's waterways to become swollen. Around midday, an intense storm moved in from the northeast, completely overwhelming East Creek and West Creek which run through the CBD.  fell in one day
The flood caused damage to properties and infrastructure, and resulted in the deaths of 2 people in Toowoomba.

Of these:
 Age distribution: Residents had a similar distribution of ages to the country overall.  The median age was 38 years, the same as the national median of 38 years. Children aged under 15 years made up 19.1% of the population (national average is 18.7%) and people aged 65 years and over made up 13.1% of the population (national average is 10.7%).
  Ethnic diversity : 79.1% were born in Australia, compared to the national average of 66.7%; the next most common countries of birth were England 1.9%, New Zealand 1.4%, India 1.2%, Philippines 0.8% and South Africa 0.6%. At home, 84.6% of residents only spoke English; the next most common languages spoken at home were Arabic 0.8%, Mandarin 0.8%, Dinka 0.4%, Tagalog 0.3% and Punjabi 0.3%.
 Finances: The median household weekly income was $1,206, compared to the national median of $1,438. This difference is also reflected in real estate, with the median mortgage payment being $1,517 per month, compared to the national median of $1,755.
 Housing: The majority (76.3%) of occupied private dwellings were separate houses, 16.1% were semi-detached (row or terrace houses, townhouses etc.), and 6.4% were flats, units or apartments. The average household size was 2.4 people.
 Transport: On the day of the Census, 0.8% of employed people travelled to work on public transport, and 77.9% by car (either as driver or as passenger).

Climate
Toowoomba has a warm humid subtropical climate (with warm summers and cool winters). Compared to other parts of Queensland, Toowoomba experiences more frequent high winds, hail, frost and fog and is considered cooler than many other towns and cities in Queensland. The city is rather sunny, receiving 107.2 clear days annually.

Unlike most of inland Queensland, summer temperatures above  are uncommon, whilst winter days rarely warm above . Winter nights seldom drop below freezing; however, in a situation unique among Queensland cities, snow has been reported on the higher parts of the city on several occasions. Light frost will be experienced several nights each winter in the city centre, more often in the western suburbs.

The majority of Toowoomba's rain falls from November to March, with January and February being the peak rainy months. Like most of south-east Queensland, severe thunderstorms can be a threat and Toowoomba may occasionally be affected by ex-tropical cyclones.

Architecture and Heritage

Toowoomba's history has been preserved in its buildings. Examples of architecture drawing from the city's wealthy beginnings include Toowoomba City Hall which was Queensland's first purpose-built town hall, the National Trust Royal Bull's Head Inn and many examples in the heritage-listed Russell Street. Immediately to the east of the CBD is the Caledonian Estate, an area of turn-of-the-20th-century housing, ranging from humble workers cottages to large stately homes, in the classic wooden Queenslander style.

Toowoomba is also home to the Empire Theatre, which was originally opened in June 1911, as a silent movie house. In February 1933, fire broke out, almost completely destroying the building. However, the Empire was rebuilt and reopened in November 1933. The architectural styling of the new Empire Theatre was art deco, in keeping with the trend of the 1930s. After years of neglect, the Empire Theatre was extensively renovated in the late 1990s, but retains much of its art deco architecture and decorations, especially the proscenium arch. Able to seat approximately 1,500 people, the Empire Theatre is now the largest regional theatre in Australia.

The city also is home to the Cobb & Co Museum, hailing to the famous mail company's beginnings as a small mail run in the 1800s to transport mail and passengers to Brisbane and beyond. It also houses Australia's largest collection of horse-drawn vehicles. The museum has undergone a A$8 million redevelopment before reopening in September 2010.

Heritage listings

Toowoomba has many heritage-listed sites, with over fifty on the Queensland Heritage Register in addition to listings on other local heritage registers.

Governance

Toowoomba is the seat of the Toowoomba Region local government area. The city is represented in the Parliament of Queensland by three seats: Toowoomba North, Toowoomba South and Condamine. In the Commonwealth Parliament, Toowoomba forms part of the Division of Groom, which is held by Garth Hamilton for the Liberal National Party of Queensland.

The current Mayor of Toowoomba is Paul Antonio, who was elected in 2012 and is currently serving his third term.

Crime 
Toowoomba has had a large amount of crime over the past years, but is still on average less than other parts of Queensland. In 2018, the Royal Automobile Club of Queensland described Toowoomba as "one of Queensland's car theft hot spots", noting that there were insurance claims for over 3,000 cars stolen over a three-year period from Harristown alone.

Economy 
The Australian Defence Force is also present in the local community, with the city providing housing and amenities for many of the personnel based at the Oakey Army Aviation Centre (in Oakey,  NW of Toowoomba) and Borneo Barracks at Cabarlah to the city's North. The headquarters of Heritage Bank, which is Australia's largest mutual bank, FK Gardners and Wagners are located in Toowoomba. Toowoomba itself, acts as the service centre for an economic area that reaches from the Western edge of Ipswich in the East, to Northern New South Wales in the south and the QLD Border to the west.

Education

Toowoomba is a major education centre with a strong presence of boarders from Western Queensland attending Schools such as Toowoomba Grammar, Fairholme College, Downlands College and The Glennie School.

Primary

State
 Darling Heights State School
 Drayton State School is the oldest school in Toowoomba.
 Fairview Heights State School
 Gabbinbar State School
 Glenvale State School
 Harlaxton State School
 Harristown State Primary School
 Middle Ridge State School
 Newtown State School
 Rangeville State School
 Rockville State School
 Toowoomba East State School
 Toowoomba North State School
 Toowoomba South State School is the oldest school in Toowoomba proper.
 Wilsonton State School

Private/Religious
 Christian Outreach College Toowoomba
 Concordia Lutheran College (2 campuses)
 Darling Downs Christian School
 Downlands College independent Catholic Co-educational Day and Boarding school
 Fairholme College
 The Glennie School
 Grammar Junior
 Glenvale Christian School
 Holy Name Catholic Primary School
 Mater Dei
 Our Lady of Lourdes School
 Sacred Heart School
 St Anthony's Primary School Toowoomba
 St Thomas More's School
 St Saviours Primary School
 Toowoomba Anglican College and Preparatory School
 Toowoomba Christian College

Secondary

State
 Centenary Heights State High School
 Toowoomba Flexi School (annexe of Centenary Heights State High School)
 Clifford Park Special School
 Harristown State High School
 Toowoomba State High School
 Wilsonton State High School

Private/Religious
 Christian Outreach College Christian co-educational school.
 Concordia College
 Darling Downs Christian School
 Downlands College independent Catholic Co-educational Day and Boarding school
 Fairholme College a Presbyterian Church of Queensland school.
 The Glennie School- Anglican day and boarding school
 St Joseph's College
 St. Mary's College
 St Saviour's, Toowoomba's oldest Catholic school
 St Ursula's College Independent Catholic day and boarding school for girls
 Toowoomba Anglican College and Preparatory School
 Toowoomba Christian College
 Toowoomba Grammar School, independent grammar school (est.1875).
 Mary Mackillop Secondary College- forms part of the existing primary campus in Highfields, opened in 2016

Tertiary
 University of Southern Queensland
 TAFE Queensland South West (Formerly SQIT) has extensive campuses to the east of the CBD.
 University of Queensland has a small centre in Toowoomba.
 Griffith University has a small health training facility in Toowoomba.

Culture

Festivals

Toowoomba is nationally renowned for the annual Carnival of Flowers, held each year in September. Many of the city's major parks and gardens are especially prepared for the carnival, including an important home garden competition and parade of flower floats. Buses bring people from around the nation, and a popular way to arrive at the carnival from Brisbane is on chartered antique steam and diesel trains, which captures the yester-year aspect of travel to Toowoomba with 19th-century wooden carriages.

In 1953 the Carnival of Flowers was the subject of a sponsored film produced by the Queensland Minister for Lands and Irrigation. The Carnival of Flowers depicts the floral parade, the home gardens competition and the crowning of the Floral Queen and is a wonderful portrait of life in 1950s Queensland.

In 2009 as part of the Q150 celebrations, Carnival of Flowers was announced as one of the Q150 Icons of Queensland for its role as an "Events and festivals".

The Toowoomba Carnival of Flowers received the Gold Award for Major Festival and Event at the Queensland Tourism Awards in 2015, 2016 & 2017, and Australian Tourism Awards in 2016 & 2017. In 2017, 255,639 people recorded as having attended the event

Toowoomba also hosts 'First Coat Art and Music Festival'. First Coat is a street art festival, held annually in May. As a result of the festival, over 50 pieces of large-scale, public art exist throughout the Toowoomba CBD, which has led to a transformation of previously underutilised lane and alleyways, as well as a reduction in costs associated with graffiti management.

Toowoomba was previously home to Easterfest (which was held annually over the Easter weekend.) The event has not continued after 2015.

The "Food and Wine Festival", which usually spans for 3 days, happens every year at Carnival of flowers time. It provides entertainment, food and drinks and is a spectacle of the Carnival.

Food
Toowoomba is also home to the Weis Bar (until 2020 when production ceases and moves to Minto, NSW), Home Ice Cream, Homestyle Bake and possibly the Lamington. Toowoomba has a thriving cafe and restaurant scene that is often compared to Melbourne in its maturity and depth.

Sport

Rugby league is a popular sport in Toowoomba. A team representing Toowoomba used to compete in the Bulimba Cup tournament. Toowoomba currently does not host a team in any of the major national competitions but was home to the Toowoomba Clydesdales in the Queensland Cup state league. 
The Clydesdales were the feeder team for Brisbane Broncos in the National Rugby League (NRL) from 1999 to 2006. The Clysedales dropped out of the Queensland Cup after the 2006 season due to financial difficulties and are no longer a feeder club for the Brisbane Broncos. In 2018 a game will be held between the Gold Coast Titans and the St George Illawarra Dragons on Sunday, 25 March at the Toowoomba Sports Ground.

Toowoomba features a semi-professional football club, South West Queensland Thunder, that has a large following within the community.  Toowoomba is the headquarters of Football Darling Downs which administers football in Toowoomba and surrounding towns and regions.  Toowoomba is home to 12 clubs including South West Queensland Thunder - Fairholme College, Garden City Raiders, Highfields, Rockville Rovers, St Albans, South Toowoomba Hawks, St Ursula's College, University of Southern Queensland, West Wanderers and Willowburn.

Australian rules football is played by four senior teams in the AFL Darling Downs competition: Coolaroo, Toowoomba Tigers, University of Southern Queensland and South Toowoomba. The sport has gained popularity amongst juniors with eleven clubs in the region. The four Senior Toowoomba clubs compete with five other clubs in towns such as Dalby, Gatton, Goondiwindi, Highfields and Warwick. In 2006, Brad Howard became the first draftee from Toowoomba to the Australian Football League.

Toowoomba has clubs for other sports including cricket (Toowoomba Cricket Inc), archery, swimming, tennis, softball, baseball, netball (Toowoomba Netball Association), hockey (Toowoomba Hockey Association), gridiron (Chargers) and basketball (Toowoomba Basketball Association). The city is also home to the Toowoomba Mountaineers basketball team, which participates in the Queensland Basketball League (QBL).

Toowoomba also shares two prestigious golf courses; Toowoomba Golf Club Middle Ridge, and City Golf Club Toowoomba. These two clubs, as well as several other clubs in the district, conduct an annual Pennant season. Each club take on each other in Match play and in several different divisions to be crowned the Pennant winners of the Year. City Golf Club also hosted the Queensland PGA Championship from 2009 to 2013.

Sport at both junior and senior level in Toowoomba and surrounding areas is promoted by Sports Darling Downs, a non-profit organisation based in Toowoomba.

Toowoomba is home to Clifford Park Racecourse. Clifford Park Racecourse was acquired as a  block in 1861.

The Toowoomba Turf Club was formed in 1882 and the first recorded Toowoomba Cup was run in 1919. In 1992, the club made Australian racing history by staging the first race ever run under electric lights: the Fosters Toowoomba Cup, which was won by Waigani Drive. In 1996 the club staged the first night race meeting in Australia.

Toowoomba has a number of rugby union teams, including University of Southern Queensland Rugby Union Club, Toowoomba Rangers Rugby Union Club, Toowoomba City Rugby Club, which compete in the Darling Downs Rugby Union competition, against such teams as the Roma Echidnas, the Condamine Cods, the Dalby Wheatmen, the Goondiwindi Emus, the Warwick Water Rats and the University of Queensland Rugby Union Club (Gatton Campus).

Cycling is a popular sport in Toowoomba. The Tour of Toowoomba in 2010 became a round of the Subaru National Road Series and attracted 15 teams. A proposal to stage a National Road Series event in Toowoomba was first presented to the Toowoomba Cycling Club in late 2009 by John Osborne OAM, a lifelong cycling enthusiast. The inaugural FKG Tour of Toowoomba was won by Patrick Shaw riding for the Virgin Blue RBS Morgan team. Patrick was later named Cycling Australia's Road Cyclist of the Year – 2010.

Founded in 1950, the Toowoomba Auto Club ran races at the nearby Leyburn Airfield and Lowood Airfield Circuits in the 1950s and 1960s, and also ran races on the streets of Middle Ridge as part of the Carnival of Flowers in 1958, 1960 and 1961, with the feature races won by Glynn Scott, Alec Mildren and Arnold Glass respectively. The club built the Echo Valley facility, initially as a hillclimbing venue officially opened on 18 September 1966, with the facility now operating as a motocross track. The Australian Hillclimb Championship was held on Prince Henry Drive in 1955 and 1961. From 1923 to 1928 racing for both motorcycle speedway and for cars was held at Werrington Park Speedway on a site south of the Toowoomba City Aerodrome.

Toowoomba is home to three parkrun events: Toowoomba (founded 2013 at Queens Park), Highfields (founded 2015) and South Toowoomba (founded 2018). Toowoomba's parkrun events are some of the best attended in Australia with as many as 500 participants.

Community groups 
The Toowoomba branch of the Queensland Country Women's Association meets at 263 Margaret Street and the Toowoomba City Business Women's branch meets at 161 Margaret Street.

There are 6 Rotary clubs operating within Toowoomba. All are active within the community raising funds annually in excess of $200,000. The Rotary Cub of Toowoomba meets at Burke and Wills Hotel, 554 Ruthven Street.

Media

Print
 The Darling Downs Gazette (June 1858 to October 1922)
 The Chronicle (since July 1861)
 High Country Herald
 The Coffee Gazette (since October 2014)
 Darling Downs Star (July 1955 to September 2003)
 Toowoomba's Mail (since September 2003)
 Toowoomba Telegraph (October 2012 to July 2013)

Television
Toowoomba is serviced by three commercial national network stations and two national non-commercial network stations. These are Seven Queensland, SCA 10 (Network 10), WIN Television (Nine Network), ABC Television and Special Broadcasting Service.  Each broadcasts television services in digital format, with analogue transmissions having been deactivated on 6 December 2011.
 Seven Queensland (STQ), 7Two, 7mate, 7Bravo, 7flix - Seven Network owned channels.
 WIN Television, 9Gem, 9Go!, 9Life - Nine Network affiliated channels.
 SCA 10, 10 Bold, 10 Peach, 10 Shake - Network 10 affiliated channels.
 Special Broadcasting Service, SBS, SBS Viceland, SBS Food, NITV
 ABC Television, ABC TV, ABC TV Plus, ABC Kids (Australia), ABC Me, ABC News
Of the three commercial networks, Seven Queensland and WIN Television both air 30-minute local news bulletins at 6pm each weeknight, produced from newsrooms in the city but broadcast from studios in Maroochydore and Wollongong respectively. Southern Cross Nine aired a regional Queensland edition of Nine News from Brisbane, featuring local opt-outs for Toowoomba and the Darling Downs from August 2017 to February 2019.

Brisbane metropolitan commercial channels BTQ-7 (Seven Network), QTQ-9 (Nine Network) and TVQ-10 (Network Ten) broadcasting from transmission towers at Mount Coot-tha can also be received in some parts of Toowoomba.

Radio 
Toowoomba has many different radio stations including FM and AM channels. Below is a list of some stations available in Toowoomba.

 Hit 100.7 Darling Downs (100.7 FM)
 Triple M Darling Downs 864 (864 AM) 
 ABC Southern Queensland (747 AM)
 92.9 Voice FM  (92.9 FM)
 River949 (94.9 FM)
 ABC News Radio (96.7 FM)  
 Power FM (88.0 FM)
 Community Radio (101.7 FM)
 Triple J (103.3 FM / 104.1 FM)
 ABC Radio Queensland (104.9 FM)
 ABC Classic FM (107.3 FM)
 4WK (963 AM)
 4AK (1242 AM)
 The Breeze (1620 AM)

Infrastructure

Transport
There is a suburban bus service operated by Bus Queensland Toowoomba throughout the city. This is a TransLink service. Stonestreets Coaches operate many school services in the city.

There are frequent inter-city bus services between Toowoomba and Brisbane, and other centres operated by Greyhound Australia and Murrays. Toowoomba was the headquarters for McCafferty's Coaches that operated a national long-distance coach network until its sale to Greyhound Australia in 2004.

Toowoomba station has a twice-weekly rail service from Brisbane to Charleville and return on Queensland Rail's The Westlander.  Toowoomba is criss-crossed by several railway lines that are used for freight, and idle railway stations can be found in the suburbs (including Ballard, Drayton, Harlaxton and Harristown), dating to when these localities were separate centres.

Toowoomba is served by Toowoomba Wellcamp Airport, which is serviced by Bonza, QantasLink and Regional Express Airlines, with flights to Brisbane, Sydney, Melbourne, Townsville, Whitsundays and destinations west of the city.

Toowoomba City Aerodrome is located in Toowoomba's outer suburb of Wilsonton. The city's former airport is now primarily used by the Royal Flying Doctor Service, LifeFlight and the Darling Downs Aero Club.

Health
Toowoomba is serviced by four hospitals: Toowoomba Base Hospital, which is a public hospital and one of the largest hospitals in regional Australia, this will soon be replaced via a redevelopment at the Baillie Henderson Hospital site; a specialist psychiatric hospital called Baillie Henderson Hospital; and two private hospitals: St. Andrew's Toowoomba Hospital and St. Vincents Hospital. There is also the Toowoomba Hospice which is a community-based private healthcare facility which provides palliative care to the terminally ill.

Water
Toowoomba's third water storage Cressbrook Dam was completed in 1983 and supplied water to Toowoomba in 1988. The city also has underground supplies in fractured basalt of the rock unit known as the Main Range Volcanics. Toowoomba also sits above the eastern edge of the Great Artesian Basin and to the west underground water is available beneath unconsolidated alluvium.

Rainfall during the period from 1998 to 2005 was 30% below the long term average, consistent with a prolonged drought; with this trend continuing through to the spring of 2007. In mid-2005, the water situation for the city was becoming critical with water supply levels below 30%. Environmental flows from Cressbrook Dam into Cressbrook Creek were allowed to cease as Toowoomba approached level five water restrictions. During March 2006 the surface water storage in the dams fell below 25% of full capacity, falling further to 12.8% on 10 March 2008 and reaching an all-time low of 7.7% in December 2009.

The former Toowoomba Mayor Di Thorley proposed a controversial potable reuse project under the Toowoomba Water Futures plan which would result in water reclaimed from the Wetalla Sewage Treatment Plant being returned to Cooby Dam to provide 25% of the potable water supply for Toowoomba. Other water supply options include importing water from Oakey Creek Groundwater Management Area (average TDS 1660 mg/L), importing water from Condamine Groundwater Management Area (average TDS 740 mg/L), and water from coal seam gas production (TDS 1200–4300 mg/L).

On 29 July 2006, Toowoomba City Council conducted a poll of Toowoomba residents on the proposal to use this multi-barrier filtration system for filtering sewage for drinking purposes. The poll question was: "Do you support the addition of purified recycled water to Toowoomba's water supply via Cooby Dam as proposed by Water Futures – Toowoomba?" 38% of voters supported the proposal and 62% opposed. This meant that despite dams reaching critical levels, the city rejected the use of recycled water in a plebiscite. Since the public rejection in 2006 of adding recycled sewage to the drinking water supply, water conservation measures have included harvesting stormwater for use in public parks and adding filtered groundwater to the town water supply. The city was under level 5 water restrictions as of 26 September 2006. This prohibits residents from using town water on their lawns, gardens or cars, and residents are strongly urged to cut down on water consumption.

In 2007, the Toowoomba City Council commenced a bore drilling program to augment the dwindling dam supplies and constructed several subartesian bores across the city and one artesian bore at Wetalla in the city's north. Many of the subartesian bores provided potable water with a reliable yield and have been developed into production however the artesian bore's water quality was very poor, prohibiting development as a potable source. In January 2008, yield testing had been stalled due to the unavailability of appropriate pumping equipment. The Toowoomba Regional Council began supplementing the city's water supply with bore water from the Great Artesian Basin in September 2009. Groundwater has become a significant contributor to the city's water supply needs and now constitutes one third of the total volume of water treated for reticulated supply ( per week).

The state government has built a $187 million pipeline from Wivenhoe Dam to Toowoomba. Water pumping along the  pipeline to Cressbrook Dam began in January 2010.

People

Notable people

Sister cities
Toowoomba has sister city relations with three international cities: Wanganui, New Zealand; Takatsuki, Japan; and Paju, South Korea.

Religion
The  recorded the following statistics for religious affiliation in Toowoomba: No religion 32.5%; Catholic 20.2%; Anglican 14.2%; Other Christian 5.1%.

Toowoomba Wesleyan Methodist Church is at 267 North Street, Wilsonton Heights. It is part of the Wesleyan Methodist Church of Australia.

Toowoomba Chinese Wesleyan Methodist Church is at 21 Kookaburra Court, Glenvale. It is part of the Wesleyan Methodist Church of Australia.

Harrison (2006) has noted the appeal of Toowoomba as 'fertile ground' for fundamentalist Christian movements, particularly those with a religio-political outlook.  This was exemplified by the Logos Foundation under the leadership of Howard Carter in the 1980s.

References

Attribution

Further reading
  Knowles, J. (1959) Toowoomba as a Railway Centre, Australian Railway Historical Society Bulletin, January 1959 pp. 10–16.

External links

Toowoomba.org – Toowoomba's Homepage
Toowoomba Tourist Information

 
Darling Downs
Towns in the Darling Downs
1849 establishments in Australia
Populated places established in 1849